This article presents the demographic history of Serbia through census results. See Demographics of Serbia for a more detailed overview of the current demographics from 2011 census.

Censuses

Censuses in Serbia ordinarily takes place every 10 years, organized by the Statistical Office of the Republic of Serbia. The last census was in 2011. The censuses were organized in 2011, 2002, 1991, 1981, 1971, 1961, 1953 and 1948, during Yugoslavia. During the Kingdom of Yugoslavia, censuses were conducted in 1931 and 1921; the census in 1941 was never conducted due to the outbreak of WWII.

The independent Principality of Serbia, had conducted the first population census in 1834; the subsequent censuses were conducted in 1841, 1843, 1846, 1850, 1854, 1859, 1863 and 1866 and 1874. During the era Kingdom of Serbia, six censuses were conducted in 1884, 1890, 1895, 1900, 1905 and the last one being in 1910.

19th century 

The censuses of 1846, 1850 and 1854 were partially published in Glasnik DSS. The Statistical Office was established in 1862. Since 1863, the Office published Državopis Srbije in twenty volumes, until 1894. Statistical data continued to be published in the new edition of Statistika Kraljevine Srbije, published since 1892. Little is known in historiography about the censuses through 1859.

1834 census 
TOTAL = 678,192

Serbia was divided into 15 counties with 61 districts called kapetanija ("captaincy", after 1834 called srez). Užice was not included due to unrest.

1841 census 
TOTAL = 828,895

1843 census 
TOTAL = 859,545

1846 census 
TOTAL = 915,080

Extracts in Glasnik DSS.

1850 census 
TOTAL = 956,893

Extracts in Glasnik DSS.

1854 census 
TOTAL = 998,919

Extracts in Glasnik DSS.

1859 census 
TOTAL = 1,078,281

Published in 1863.

1863 census 
TOTAL = 1,108,668

1866 census 
TOTAL = 1,216,219
Serbs = 1,058,189 (87.01%)
Romanians = 127,545 (10.49%)
Roma ("Gypsies") = 24,607 (2.02%)
Germans = 2,589 (0.21%)
 other = 3,256 (0.27%)

This was the first census which recorded literacy, nationality (ethnicity) and citizenship.

1874 census 
Total

1878 census 
TOTAL = 1,669,337

In 1879 there was a census in the four counties ceded to Serbia in 1878.

1884 census 
Total

1890 census 
Total

1895 census 
TOTAL = 2,493,770
Serbs = over 2 million (ca. 90%)
Romanians = 159,000 (6.43%)
Roma ("Gypsies") = 46,000 (1.84%)

20th century

1905 census 
Total

1910 census 
Total 2,922,258

1921 census 

TOTAL = 4,133,478
Serbs and Croats = 3,339,369 (80.87%)
Albanians = 420,473 (10.17%)
Romanians = 159,549 (3.86%)
Turks = 149,210 (3.61%)
Germans = 5,969
Russians = 4,176
Slovenes = 3,625
Czechs and Slovaks = 2,801
Hungarians = 2,532
French = 717
Italians = 503
Poles = 286
English = 231
Ruthenians = 35
other (mostly Romani) = 44,002

1948 census 
TOTAL = 6,527,966
Serbs and Croats = 4,823,730 (73.89%)
Albanians = 532,011 (8.15%)
Hungarians = 433,701 (6.64%)
Montenegrins = 74,860 (1.15%)
Slovaks = 72,032 (1.1%)
Bulgarians = 59,395	
Roma = 52,181
Slovenes = 20,998
Macedonians = 17,917
ethnic Muslims = 17,315

1953 census 
TOTAL = 6,979,154
Serbs = 5,152,939 (73.83%)
Albanians = 565,513 (8.10%)
Hungarians = 441,907 (6.33%)
Croats = 173,246 (2.48%)
Montenegrins = 86,061 (1.23%)
ethnic Muslims = 81,081 (1.16%)
Slovaks = 71,153 (1%)
Bulgarians = 60,146
Roma = 58,800
Macedonians = 27,277
Slovenes = 20,717

1961 census 
TOTAL = 7,642,227
Serbs = 5,704,686 (74.65%)
Albanians = 699,772 (9.16%)
Hungarians = 449,587 (5.88%)
Croats = 196,409 (2.57%)
Montenegrins = 104,753 (1.37%)
ethnic Muslims = 93,467 (1.22%)
Slovaks = 73,830 
Bulgarians = 58,243
Macedonians = 36,288
Yugoslavs = 20,079
Slovenes = 19,957
Roma = 9,826

1971 census 
TOTAL = 8,446,591
Serbs = 6,016,811 (71.23%)
Albanians = 984,761 (11.66%)
Hungarians = 430,314 (5.10%)
Croats = 184,913 (2.19%)
ethnic Muslims = 154,330 (1.83%)
Montenegrins = 125,260 (1.48%)
Yugoslavs = 123,824 (1.47%)
Slovaks = 76,733
Romanians (self-declared) = 57,419
Bulgarians = 53,536
Roma = 49,894
Macedonians = 42,675
Rusyns = 20,608
Turks = 18,220
Slovenes = 15,957
"Vlachs" (Romanians) = 14,724

1981 census 
TOTAL = 9,313,677
Serbs = 6,182,159 (66.38%)
Albanians = 1,303,032 (13.99%)
Yugoslavs = 441,941 (4.75%)
Hungarians = 390,468 (4.19%)
ethnic Muslims = 215,166 (2.31%)
Croats = 149,368 (1.60%)
Montenegrins = 147,466 (1.58%)
Roma = 110,956 (1.19%)
Slovaks = 69,549
Macedonians = 48,986
Bulgarians = 33,294
Slovenes = 12,006

1991 census 
TOTAL (official estimation) = 9,778,991 (registered 8,182,141)
Serbs = 6,446,595 (65.92%)
Albanians (official estimation) = 1,674,353 (17.12%), registered 87,372
Hungarians = 343,800 (3.52%)
Yugoslavs = 323,643 (3.31%)
ethnic Muslims (official estimation) = 246,411 (2.52%), registered 237,980
Roma (official estimation) = 140,237 (1.43%), registered 138,799
Montenegrins = 139,299 (1.42%)
Croats = 105,406 (1.08%)

Estimated population:

Registered population:

1991 census 

TOTAL = 7,822,795
Serbs = 6,252,405 (79.93%)
Hungarians = 343,800 (4.39%)
Yugoslavs = 320,186 (4.09%)
ethnic Muslims = 180,222 (2.3%)
Montenegrins = 118,934 (1.52%)
Croats = 97,344 (1.24%)
Roma = 94,491 (1.21%)
Albanians = 78,281 (1%)
Slovaks = 66,772 (0.85%)
Macedonians = 45,068 (0.58%)
Romanians (self-declared) = 42,316 (0.54%)
Bulgarians = 26,698 (0.34%)
Bunjevci = 21,434 (0.34%)
Ukrainians = 5,042 (0.23%)
"Vlachs" (Romanians) = 17,804 (0.23%)
others = 34,698 (0.44%)
regional affiliation = 4,841 (0.06%)
unknown = 47,949 (0.61%)
unspecified = 10,538 (0.13%)

21st century

2002 census 

TOTAL = 7,498,001
Serbs = 6,212,838 (82.86%)
Hungarians = 293,299 (3.91%)
Bosniaks = 136,087 (1.82%)
Roma = 108,193 (1.44%)
Yugoslavs = 80,721 (1.08%)
Croats = 70,602 (0.94%)
Montenegrins = 69,049 (0.92%)
Albanians = 61,647 (0.82%)
Slovaks = 59,021 (0.79%)
"Vlachs" (Romanians) = 40,054 (0.53%)
Romanians (self-declared) = 34,576 (0.46%)
Macedonians = 25,847 (0.35%)
Bulgarians = 20,497 (0.27%)
Bunjevci = 20,012 (0.27%)
ethnic Muslims = 19,503 (0.26%)
Rusyns = 15,905 (0.21%)
Ukrainians = 5,354 (0.07%)
Slovenes = 5,104
Gorani = 4,581
Germans = 3,901
Czechs = 2,211
others = 11,711 (0.19%)
regional affiliation = 11,485 (0.15%)
unknown = 75,483 (1.01%)
unspecified = 107,732 (1.44%)

2011 census 

TOTAL = 7,186,862
Serbs = 5,988,150 (83.32%)
Hungarians = 253,899 (3.53%)
Roma = 147,604 (2.05%)
Bosniaks = 145,278 (2.02%)
Croats = 57,900 (0.81%)
Slovaks = 52,750 (0.73%)
Albanians = 5,809 (0.08%) (mostly boycotted the census, estimate c. 50,000 i.e. 0.7%)
Montenegrins = 38,527 (0.54%)
"Vlachs" (Romanians) = 35,330 (0.49%)
Romanians (self-declared) = 29,332 (0.41%)
Yugoslavs = 23,303 (0.32%)
Macedonians = 22,755 (0.32%)
ethnic Muslims = 22,301 (0.31%)
Bulgarians = 18,543 (0.26%)
Bunjevci = 16,706 (0.23%)
Rusyns = 14,246 (0.2%)
Gorani = 7,767 (0.11%)
Ukrainians = 4,903 (0.07%)
Germans = 4,064 (0.06%)
Slovenes = 4,033 (0.06%)
others = 17,558 (0.24%)
regional affiliation = 30,771 (0.43%)
unknown = 81,740 (1.14%)
unspecified = 160,346 (2.23%)

Vital statistics

1880–1887

Source:

1900–1912

Source:

See also
 Demographic history of Vojvodina
 Demographic history of Kosovo
 Demographics of Serbia

References

Sources
 
  
 
Ђорђевић, Тихомир. "Насељавање Србије, за време прве владе кнеза Милоша Обреновића (1815-1839)." Гласник Српског географског друштва 5 (1921): 116-139.

External links
 Serbian Census website
 Central Statistics Office website 
 The census form